The 2022 Tarleton State Texans football team represented Tarleton State University as a member of the Western Athletic Conference (WAC) during the 2022 NCAA Division I FCS football season. They were led by head coach Todd Whitten, who was coaching his thirteenth season overall with the program. The Texans played their home games at Memorial Stadium in Stephenville, Texas.

Schedule
Tarleton State finalized their 2022 schedule on January 14, 2022. The Texans will not play Utah Tech (formally Dixie State), due to prior scheduling commitments.

Game summaries

Mississippi Valley State

at TCU

Eastern New Mexico

at North Alabama

at Southern Utah

at Stephen F. Austin

Southwest Baptist

Sam Houston

Abilene Christian

at Utah Tech

Houston Christian

References

Tarleton State
Tarleton State Texans football seasons
Tarleton State Texans football